Ramganj Mandi is a railway station in Ramganj Mandi, Rajasthan, India. It is categorized as "NSG-4" station in Kota division of West Central Railway zone of Indian Railways. Currently the Ramganj Mandi–Bhopal section is under construction, completed to Jhalawar City and Kalisindh Thermal Power Plant.

References

 
 
 
https://drive.google.com/file/d/11zSoGuzsBzuKsQewh-1KUqsWFKySlXGO/view?usp=drivesdk
Time Table w.e.f. 01-07-2019

Railway stations in Kota district
Railway stations opened in 1903
Kota railway division